Rajyotsava Awards are awarded every year on November 1, the eve of Karnataka Rajyotsava, the day Karnataka State was formed. 

Below are the dignitaries, who were awarded the same for the year 2022.

Sankeerna (Complex) Category
Achievers whose contribution is in more than 1 field are awarded under 
 Subbarama Shetty (Bangalore)
 Vidwan Gopal Krishna Sharma (Bangalore),
 Mrs. Soligara Madamma (Chamarajanagar)

Military Service/Soldiers
 Subedar BK Kumaraswamy (Bangalore)

Journalism
 H.R. Srisha (Bangalore),
 GM Shirahatti (Gadag)

Agriculture
 Ganesh Thimmaiah (Kodagu),
 Chandrasekhar Narayanpur (Chikkamagaluru)

Science and Technology
 K. Sivan (Bangalore)
 D.R.Baluragi (Raichur)

Environment
 Salumada Ninganna (Ramanagar)

Civil Service
 Mallamma Hoovina Hadagali, pourakarmika personnel (Vijayanagar)

Administration
L.H. Manjunath (Shivamogga),
 Madan Gopal IAS (Retd) (Bangalore)

NRK/Abroad
Devidas Shetty (Mumbai),
 Arvind Patil (Overseas),
 Krishnamurthy Manja (Telangana)
 Rajkumar of Gulf Country (Gulf Nation)

Medical
 Dr. H. S. Mohan (Shivamogga)
 Dr. Basavanthappa (Davanagere)

Social service
 Ravishetti (South Kannada)
 Kariappa (Bangalore Rural)
 MS KoriShetter (Haveri)
 D. Madegowda (Mysore)
 Balbir Singh (Bidar)

Media Brroadcasting
 BV Naidu (Bangalore)
 Jayaram Banan (Udupi)
 Srinivas (Kolar)

Theatre
Tippanna Helavar (Yadagiri)
 Lalitabai Channadasar (Vijaypur)
 Gurunath Hoogar (Kalaburgi)
 Prabhakar Joshi (Udupi)
 Srishaila Huddar (Haveri)

Music
 Narayan.M (South Kannada)
 Anantacharya Balacharya (Dharwad)
 Anjinappa Satpadi (Chikkaballapur)
 Ananta Kulkarni (Bagalakot)

Folklore
 Samadevappa Erappa Nadiger (Northern Kannada)
 Gudda Panara-Divine Dancer (Udupi)
 Kamalamma Midwife (Raichur)
 Savitri Pujar (Dharwad)
 Rachaiah Salimath (Balakote),
 Mahadeshwar Gowda Lingadahalli, Veeragase (Haveri)

Sculpture
 Parushuram Pawar (Bagalakot),
 Hanumanthappa Balappa Hukkeri (Belagavi)

Painting/Fine Arts
 Sannarangappa Chitrakar-Kinna's Art (Koppal)

Movie
 Wing Commander H G Dattatreya popularly known as Dattanna (Chitradurga)
 Avinash (Bangalore)

Television
 Bittersweet Moon (Bangalore)

Yakshagana
 MA Naik (Udupi)
 Subrahmanya Dhareshwar (Uttar Kannada)
 Sarapadi Ashok Shetty (South Kannada)

Open
 Advaiah Cha Hiremath-Doddata (Dharwad)
 Shankarappa Mallappa Horpet (Koppal)
 H. Pandurangappa (Bellary)

Literature
 Shankar Chachadi (Belagavi)
 Krishna Gowda (Mysore)
 Ashoka Babu Nilagarh (Belgavi)
 A. Ra Mitra (Hassan)
 Ramakrishna Marathe (Kalaburgi)

Education
 Koti Rangappa (Tumkur)
 MG Nagaraj - Researcher (Bangalore)

Sports
 Dattatreya Govinda Kulkarni (Dharwad)
 Raghavendra Annekar (Belagavi)

Judiciary
 Venkatachalapathy (Bangalore)
 Nanjundereddy (Bangalore)

Dance
 Kamalaksha Acharya (South Kannada)

Amrita Mahotsava Rajyotsava Award of Independence-2022
 Ramakrishna Ashram (Mysore)
 Lingayat Progressive Organization (Gadag)
 Agadi Tota (Haveri)
 Thalassemia and Haemophilia Society (Bagalakote)
 Amrita Shishu Niwas (Bangalore)
 Sumana Foundation (Bangalore)
 Yuva Vahini Organization (South Kannada)
 Nele Foundation-Orphan Rehabilitation Center (Bangalore)
 Nammane Summane - Refugee Ashram (Mangalmukhi Institute (Bangalore)
 Uma Maheshwari Backward Classes Development Trust (MANDYA)

References

https://web.archive.org/web/20221209105656/https://www.newindianexpress.com/states/karnataka/2022/oct/31/karnataka-sivan-dattanna-among-67-to-receive-rajyotsava-awards-2513334.html
https://web.archive.org/web/20220000000000*/https://english.sakshi.com/news/national/kannada-rajyotsava-award-2022-winners-list-163876

Civil awards and decorations of Karnataka

Awards established in 1966
1966 establishments in Mysore State